We Three Kings: Christmas Favorites is a Christmas album by The Reverend Horton Heat. It was released by Yep Roc Records in October 2005.   The album features renditions of twelve popular Christmas songs.  It also features one original track.

A limited edition Christmas ornament was included with copies of the album that were pre-ordered through the band's record label.

Track listing
 "Frosty the Snowman" (Nelson, Rollins) – 3:03
 "Santa Bring My Baby Back (To Me)" (Demetrius, Schroeder) – 2:00
 "Jingle Bells" (Pierpont) – 2:19
 "Santa Claus Is Coming to Town" (Coots, Gillespie) – 3:01
 "Silver Bells" (Evans, Livingston) – 3:47
 "We Three Kings" (John Henry Hopkins) – 3:53
 "Santa Looked a Lot Like Daddy" (Owens, Rich) – 2:15
 "Rudolph the Red Nosed Reindeer" (Marks) – 3:08
 "Santa on the Roof" (Heath) – 2:47
 "What Child Is This" (Traditional) – 4:11
 "Pretty Paper" (Nelson) – 3:06
 "Winter Wonderland" (Bernard, Smith) – 3:23
 "Run Rudolph Run" (Broadie, Marks) – 2:49

Personnel
 Jim Heath (aka Rev. Horton Heat) - vocals, guitar
 Jimbo Wallace - upright bass
 Scott Churilla - drums
 Tim Alexander - arrangement (tracks 1, 3, 4, 5, 6, 8, 10, and 12)
 Paul Williams - recording and mixing
 Dave Harris - mastering
 Mary Gunn - art direction and graphic design

References

The Reverend Horton Heat albums
Yep Roc Records albums
2005 Christmas albums
Christmas albums by American artists